is a 1914 Austro-Hungarian comedy film directed by Alois Jalovec.

Cast
 Antonín Michl as Cobbler
 Katy Kaclová-Valisová as Cobbler's Daughter
 Frantisek Fort as Suitor
 Rudolf Innemann
 Miroslav Innemann

References

External links
 

1914 comedy films
1914 films
Austrian black-and-white films
Hungarian black-and-white films
Hungarian silent films
Austrian silent films
Austro-Hungarian films